Quasi-reflexive may refer to:

 Quasi-reflexive relation
 Quasi-reflexive space